Augustus Fisher Scott (19 February 1921 – 28 November 1998) was an English football player and manager who played in the Football League as a forward for Southampton and Colchester United. He managed Southern League clubs Chelmsford City and Cheltenham Town.

Career

Born in Sunderland, Scott was spotted by Luton Town prior to World War II playing for Hylton Colliery. Following the war, he moved to Southampton in July 1947, where he scored nine goals in 46 league matches for the Saints.

Scott signed for Colchester United for a club record fee of £2,000 in the summer of 1951, with Colchester battling against Cardiff City for his signature. He made his debut for the U's on 18 August 1951, the opening game of the season and a heavy 5–1 defeat to Brighton & Hove Albion at the Goldstone Ground. He scored his first goals for Colchester during a 4–2 defeat to Reading at Elm Park on 10 November 1951, scoring a brace. Scott made 120 Football League appearances for Colchester between 1951 and 1954, scoring 10 goals, with his final goal the consolation in a 2–1 defeat to rivals Ipswich Town at Layer Road on 19 December 1953. He played his final match for United on 17 April 1954 in a 3–0 win against Millwall.

Scott was released by Colchester in the summer of 1954 to become player-manager at neighbours Chelmsford City. He would also act as player-coach at Cheltenham Town where he led the team to victory in the Southern League Cup over Gravesend in 1958.

Scott later worked in the building trade, retiring in Southampton in 1986. He died on 28 November 1998.

References

1921 births
1998 deaths
Footballers from Sunderland
English footballers
Association football forwards
Hylton Colliery Welfare F.C. players
Luton Town F.C. players
Southampton F.C. players
Colchester United F.C. players
Chelmsford City F.C. players
Cheltenham Town F.C. players
English Football League players
Southern Football League players
Luton Town F.C. wartime guest players
English football managers
Chelmsford City F.C. managers
Cheltenham Town F.C. managers
Southern Football League managers